Glen Meadmore is a Canadian musician, actor, and performance artist currently residing in Los Angeles, United States. His music is often described as Cowpunk.

Biography
Glen Meadmore was born in Winnipeg, Manitoba, Canada.  As a teenager, Meadmore played bass and sang with Winnipeg punk band The Psychiatrists.  He later became involved in performance art, and appeared on local community television on his own cable show.  Meadmore is 6'8" tall. 

Meadmore moved to Los Angeles in the early 1980s. He continued to work as a performance artist, appearing at the nightclub the Anti-Club where he became renowned for his outrageous performances. During this time, he met African American queer political performance artist Vaginal Davis and the two formed the band Pedro, Muriel and Esther, also known as PME, one of the earliest queer punk bands. Both Meadmore and "Vag" performed with the band in drag. Meadmore also utilized his drag persona for underground films he was making with director John Aes-Nihil, such as The Drift. He abandoned this persona in his later films, once again playing male roles.

Meadmore developed a "country punk" persona for solo albums he began recording in 1985.  Glen's first two albums blended country stylings and country-style "yodeling" with new wave synthpop production popular at the time, which proved to be an odd and striking mélange. Drag superstar RuPaul performed as a backup singer to Meadmore, along with Vaginal Davis.

Meadmore's third release, the seminal country punk album Boned, dropped the synths and created the sound for which he is best known.

His fourth album, Hot, Horny and Born Again, was produced by Jack Curtis Dubowsky. Some of these songs were included in the Bruce LaBruce and Rick Castro film Hustler White. During the 1980s Meadmore had corresponded with serial killer John Wayne Gacy. Gacy did several paintings of Meadmore, one of which appears on the cover of his album Hot, Horny and Born Again.

Meadmore's most recent recording, Cowboy Songs For Lil Hustlers, produced by Steve Albini, continues in the vein set by Hot, Horny and Born Again.

Meadmore has performed and recorded with other artists and performers, including Helot Revolt.  Meadmore's band includes Dave Kendrick a former drummer of Devo.

June 2007 saw the reissue of Meadmore's first two LPs on CD.

In February and March 2008 Meadmore toured Germany, Austria and Switzerland.

Obscenity trial
Glen was arrested February 3, 1989 in Santa Barbara for obscenity related to a performance at UCSB's Pub as part of UCSB's Gay Awareness Week.  He was initially charged with indecent exposure, but this was reduced to Disorderly Conduct pertaining to "Lewd and Dissolute Behavior," according to the newspaper The Independent.  His attorney was Public Defender Rick Barron.  The case was heard by Municipal Court Judge Frank Ochoa.  Glen was found not guilty. This was during the 1980s when many queer performance artists were being tried for their work and having their grants taken away.

Recordings

Albums
 Chicken & Biscuits, 1987, Amoeba Records; 2007 Pervertidora Records (reissue)
 Squaw Bread, 1988 Amoeba Records; 2007 Pervertidora Records (reissue)
 Boned, Amoeba Records
 Hot, Horny, and Born Again, 1993 Pervertidora Records
 Cowboy Songs for Lil Hustlers, 2002 Pervertidora Records

Singles
 "Just a Girl" / "Arco Plaza", 12" single, 1988, Overzealous Editions
 "Slurp Ramp" / "You're The One", Tape, 2015, Idiosyncratics

Compilations
 The Ma Barker Story Soundtrack & Compilation, 1990
 Keep on the Sunny Side: A Tribute to the Carter Family CD, Amoeba Records, 1993
 Prayer Is The Answer cassette, 777 was 666, 1998
 God Came Between Us limited edition CD, 777 was 666, 2005

As PME
 "PME", 7" vinyl EP, Amoeba Records, 1991
 The White To Be Angry CD, Spectra Sonic Records, 1998

Also appeared on
 Helot Revolt, In Your Face, Up Your Butt (guitar), De Stijl Records (1992)
 Songs from Hot, Horny and Born Again are used in the film Hustler White (soundtrack unreleased)

Films
 Americans, by Chris Mullington, 1987
 The Drift, by John Aes-Nihil, 1989
 The Goddess Bunny Channels Shakespeare, by John Aes-Nihil, 1989
 The Ma Barker Story, by John Aes-Nihil, 1990
 Hustler White by Bruce LaBruce and Rick Castro, 1996
 The Goddess Bunny, by Nick Bougas, 1998
 The White To be Angry by Vaginal Davis, 1999

References

Sources
 Ciminelli, David; Knox, Ken (2005) HomoCore: The Loud and Raucous Rise of Queer Rock, Alyson Books,  
 Young, Paul (2002) L.A. Exposed: Strange Myths and Curious Legends in the City of Angels, p. 130, St. Martin's Griffin,  
 Mullen, Brendan (2006) Whores: An Oral Biography of Perry Farrell And Jane's Addiction, p. 186, (Glen as Performance artist.) Perseus Books Group,  
 The Independent May 18, 1989.  Page 7.  Article title: "Do the Funky Chicken." (On obscenity charge and trial.)
 Goldberg, Dan, "Performer Arrested in Pub for Overexposure" Daily Nexus February 6, 1989

External links
 
 Glen Meadmore on Tribe.net 
 Glen Meadmore on Queer Music Heritage produced by JD Doyle
 PME

Male actors from Winnipeg
American people of Canadian descent
Canadian punk rock musicians
Cowpunk musicians
First Nations male actors
First Nations musicians
First Nations performance artists
Canadian LGBT artists
LGBT Christians
Canadian LGBT singers
Living people
Musicians from Winnipeg
Queercore musicians
Year of birth missing (living people)
Canadian gay musicians
LGBT First Nations people
20th-century Canadian male singers
20th-century Canadian male actors
21st-century Canadian male singers
21st-century Canadian male actors
21st-century Canadian LGBT people
20th-century Canadian LGBT people